Cat and mouse, often expressed as cat-and-mouse game, is an English-language idiom that means "a contrived action involving constant pursuit, near captures, and repeated escapes." The "cat" is unable to secure a definitive victory over the "mouse", who, despite not being able to defeat the cat, is able to avoid capture. In extreme cases, the idiom may imply that the contest is never-ending. The term is derived from the hunting behavior of domestic cats, which often appear to "play" with prey by releasing it after capture. This behavior may arise from an instinctive imperative to ensure that the prey is weak enough to be killed without endangering the cat.

In colloquial usage, it has often been generalized to mean the advantage constantly shifts between the contestants, leading to an impasse or de facto stalemate.  In classical game theory, cat and mouse classifies as a "copycat" archetype whereby there exists no equilibrium, and most importantly, no endgame, its two protagonists, Dot and Ditto, running amok in their game space to infinity, with no endpoint to their game anywhere in sight attributable to a defective reward system; conflicting incentives. Theoretical active reading on "cat and mouse," or "Dot and Ditto" is ominous in its implication; multiple protagonists, each armed a passive strategy, can remain theoretically locked in total perpetual war indefinitely, wholly unable to rise to a plateau sufficient to intellectualize their plight.

The term has also been used to refer to the game hide-and-seek.

See also

 Cat play and toys
 "Cat and Mouse in Partnership", a Brothers Grimm fairytale
 Tom and Jerry cartoons
 Red Queen's race
 Arms race
 Belling the cat

References

English-language idioms
Metaphors referring to cats